Hugo Duncan Dixon (born December 1963) is a British business journalist and the former editor-in-chief and chairman of the financial commentary website Breakingviews which he co-founded. He was the editor of the Financial Times Lex column from 1994 to 1999, and a visiting fellow at Saïd Business School, Oxford University. He is the great-grandson of former British Prime Minister Sir Winston Churchill.

Early life 
Hugo Duncan Dixon was born in December 1963 to the Conservative MP Piers Dixon and the artist Edwina Sandys. The couple divorced in 1970 when Dixon was six. Dixon has an older brother, Mark Pierson Dixon, born in 1962.

Education 
Dixon was a King's Scholar at Eton and gained a first in Philosophy, Politics and Economics (PPE) at Balliol College, Oxford.

Career 
Dixon's first job was as an intern at The Economist in 1985, a year later he became junior banking correspondent for the Financial Times (FT). In 1988, aged 24, he was seconded to work for the then Social Democratic Party (SDP) leader Bob Maclennan to write the manifesto for the party's merger with the Liberals. Voices and Choices For All became known as 'the dead parrot document' after the famous Monty Python sketch because, when Liberal MPs read about its proposals in this paper, they barricaded their leader David Steel into his Commons office and told him he would be turfed out if he backed the controversial document – copies of which had already been left for journalists waiting at the press conference to announce the merger. Dixon also began working as telecoms and electronics correspondent for the FT in the same year.

In 1993 Dixon became leader writer for the FT and a year later became editor of the paper's Lex column.

Breakingviews 
Inspired by an interview with Bill Gates in 1999 Dixon quit his job at the FT and co-founded Breakingviews, with his colleague from the FT, Jonathan Ford, a website providing financial commentary. In 2007 Dixon and Ford fell out and Ford left to help set up a rival financial commentary website at Reuters.

In 2009 Dixon sold Breakingviews to Reuters for £13 million, making himself £2.5 million, with a retention bonus for Dixon to stay on as the website's editor for the following three years. The move meant that Ford lost his position at Reuters. Dixon continued as Breakingviews editor until 2012 when he became its editor-at-large, he still writes a fortnightly column for the website.

Pro-EU activism 
Dixon is pro-EU and opposed to Brexit. He is also the chair and editor-in-chief of InFacts, a website that focuses on facts and factual analysis about Brexit.

Dixon has written several pro-EU articles for The Guardian and The Independent in the aftermath of the Referendum.

Other 
Dixon is a visiting fellow at Saïd Business School, Oxford University.

Ancestry

Bibliography

Awards 
 2000 British Press Awards, Business Journalist of the Year (Financial Times)
 2008 Business Journalist of the Year Awards, Decade of Excellence Award (breakingviews)

References

Further reading 
 
Cited in:

External links 
 Official website

1963 births
Academics of Saïd Business School
Alumni of Balliol College, Oxford
British technology company founders
Financial Times people
Living people
People educated at Eton College